Tom Neville (born 25 September 1975) is a former Irish Fine Gael politician who served as a Teachta Dála (TD) for the Limerick County constituency from 2016 to 2020.

He had been a member of Limerick County Council from 2003 to 2009 and from 2014 to 2016. His father is the former Fine Gael TD Dan Neville. 

He lost his seat at the 2020 general election. He unsuccessfully contested the 2020 Seanad election.

Neville is also an actor and stand-up comedian.

References

External links

Living people
Members of the 32nd Dáil
Fine Gael TDs
Local councillors in County Limerick
1975 births